Democracy Day is June 12, a national public holiday in Nigeria. Until June 6, 2018, it was held annually on May 29. Democracy Day marks the day the military handed over power to an elected civilian government in 1999, marking the beginning of the longest continuous civilian rule since Nigeria's independence from colonial rule in 1960. It is a tradition that has been held annually, beginning in year 2000. June 12 was formerly known as Abiola Day, celebrated in Lagos, Nigeria and some south western states of Nigeria. 

Nigeria's Democracy Day is a public holiday to commemorate the restoration of democracy in the Federal Republic of Nigeria. May 29 was initially the official democracy day in Nigeria, marking when the newly elected Olusegun Obasanjo took office as the President of Nigeria in 1999, ending multiple decades of military rule that began in 1966 and had been interrupted only by a brief period of democracy from 1979 to 1983.

On June 6, 2018, eight days after May 29, 2018 had been celebrated as Democracy Day, the President Buhari-led Federal Government of Nigeria declared June 12 to be the new Democracy Day. Buhari gave his inaugural address for his second term on June 12, 2019. These were done to commemorate the democratic election of MKO Abiola on June 12, 1993, in what has been adjudged to be Nigeria's freest and fairest elections. It was, however, wrongly cancelled by the Ibrahim Babangida Junta. MKO Abiola was later detained after he rightfully declared himself the president. Chief MKO Abiola died mysteriously after drinking tea during the negotiation of his release. He started coughing in the presence of Kofi Annan and later died in the hospital. MKO promised the restoration of good governance in Nigeria.

Background
Nigeria gained independence on 1st October, 1960 from Great Britain then Nigeria fell prey to the first of so many military coups on 15th of Jan 1966, and then, a civil war.  Nigeria is therefore an emerging nation state, and we must be sure not to overlook the important difference between emerging democracies (which often are found in newly emerging states) and established democratic regimes existing in states with long traditions of uninterrupted sovereignty. The core of democracy is the principle of popular sovereignty, which holds that government can be legitimated only by the will of those whom it governs  and thus it can be understood why a military coup may not be seen as a democratic regime, and during these times Nigeria was not a democratic state.

For most of its independent history, Nigeria was ruled by a series of military juntas, interspersed by brief moments of democratic rule, for example from 1979 to 1983 with Alhaji Shehu Shagari. The last major military ruler was Gen. Sani Abacha,  who died suddenly in 1998. His successor, Gen. Abdulsalami Abubakar promised a transition to democracy, and accordingly a new constitution was adopted on May 5th, 1999. Elections were held and retired Gen. Olusegun Obasanjo, who had previously governed Nigeria as a military ruler, was elected the new president. 

The end of military rule brought about a new era of regular elections as well as the return of civil liberties, free press and an end to arbitrary arrests and torture, although human rights violations still occur regularly. Nigeria also began a long campaign against the bureaucratic and military corruption that had paralyzed its economy and severely tarnished its international reputation.

Others
The Nigerian Democracy Day theme song was written by Attih Soul on the directives of the Buhari led administration in 2017 as part of the celebration to mark the day.

See also
Democracy Day in other countries.

References

Society of Nigeria
Nigerian culture
May observances